Coots are medium-sized water birds that are members of the rail family, Rallidae. They constitute the genus Fulica, the name being the Latin term for "coot". Coots have predominantly black plumage, and—unlike many rails—they are usually easy to see, often swimming in open water.

Taxonomy and systematics
The genus Fulica was introduced in 1758 by the Swedish naturalist Carl Linnaeus in the tenth edition of his Systema Naturae. The genus name is the Latin word for a Eurasian coot. The name was used by the Swiss naturalist Conrad Gessner in 1555. The type species is the Eurasian coot.

A group of coots are referred to as a covert or cover.

Species

Extinct species

Recently extinct species 
 Fulica newtonii Milne-Edwards, 1867 – Mascarene coot (extinct, c. 1700)

Late Quaternary species 

 Fulica chathamensis Forbes, 1892 – Chatham Island coot (early Holocene of the Chatham Islands)
 Fulica montanei Alarcón-Muñoz, Labarca & Soto-Acuña, 2020 (late Pleistocene to early Holocene of Chile)
 Fulica prisca Hamilton, 1893 – New Zealand coot (early Holocene of New Zealand) 
Fulica shufeldti – (late Pleistocene of Florida) possibly a paleosubspecies of Fulica americana; formerly F. minor

Fossil species 

 Fulica infelix Brodkorb, 1961 – (early Pliocene of Juntura, Malheur County, Oregon, USA)

Description
Coots have prominent frontal shields or other decoration on the forehead, with red to dark red eyes and coloured bills. Many have white on the under tail. The featherless shield gave rise to the expression "as bald as a coot", which the Oxford English Dictionary cites in use as early as 1430. Like other rails, they have long, lobed toes that are well adapted to soft, uneven surfaces. Coots have strong legs and can walk and run vigorously. They tend to have short, rounded wings and are weak fliers, though northern species nevertheless can cover long distances.  They typically congregate in large rafts in open water.  They are socially gregarious and messy aquatic feeders.

Distribution and habitat
The greatest species variety occurs in South America, and the genus likely originated there. They are common in Europe and North America. Coot species that migrate do so at night. The American coot has been observed rarely in Britain and Ireland, while the Eurasian coot is found across Asia, Australia and parts of Africa. In southern Louisiana, the coot is referred to by the French name "poule d'eau", which translates into English as "water hen".

Behaviour and ecology
Coots are omnivorous, eating mainly plant material, but also small animals, fish and eggs. They are aggressively territorial during the breeding season, but are otherwise often found in sizeable flocks on the shallow vegetated lakes they prefer.

Chick mortality occurs mainly due to starvation rather than predation as coots have difficulty feeding a large family of hatchlings on the tiny shrimp and insects that they collect. Many chicks die in the first 10 days after hatching, when they are most dependent on adults for food. Coots can be very brutal to their own young under pressure such as the lack of food, and after about three days they start attacking their own chicks when they beg for food. After a short while, these attacks concentrate on the weaker chicks, who eventually give up begging and die. The coot may eventually raise only two or three out of nine hatchlings. In this attacking behaviour, the parents are said to "tousle" their young. This can result in the death of the chick.

References

External links

 Coot videos on the Internet Bird Collection
 

 
Rallidae
Extant Pliocene first appearances